Chris LaMark "Flash" Richardson (March 26, 1980 – December 10, 2008) was an American basketball player and a member of the Harlem Globetrotters.

Early life 
Born in Corpus Christi, Texas, Richardson moved to Las Vegas, Nevada when he began playing college basketball at the University of Nevada, Las Vegas in 1998.

Career 
Shortly after his college career ended, he joined the Harlem Globetrotters. Richardson was known for his dunking skills and a genial disposition. Sports Illustrated featured Richardson in their November 9, 1998 issue after he won the slam dunk competition as a freshman at the UNLV Fan Jam. As a senior in college, Richardson participated in the 14th Annual Slam Dunk and Three-point Championships held in Atlanta on March 28, 2002.

Death 
He died of a brain aneurysm in Japan. The Harlem Globetrotters were at a U.S. military base in Sasebo, Japan, as part of an annual holiday tour.

References

 
 
 

1980 births
2008 deaths
American expatriate basketball people in Japan
American men's basketball players
Basketball players from Texas
Harlem Globetrotters players
Sportspeople from Corpus Christi, Texas
UNLV Runnin' Rebels basketball players